Erasto Bartholomeo Mpemba (1950 – 2020) was a Tanzanian game warden who, as a schoolboy, discovered the eponymously named Mpemba effect, a paradoxical phenomenon in which hot water freezes faster than cold water under certain conditions; this effect had been observed previously by Aristotle, Francis Bacon, and René Descartes.

He discovered the phenomenon at Magamba Secondary School in 1963 while preparing ice cream to earn pocket-money. Due to lack of time, he skipped the cooling phase when preparing the ice cream and immediately put it into the freezer; unexpectedly, his milk mixture froze faster than that of his classmates.  After disputing his observations with his teacher, he raised them with Denis Gordon Osborne, who was visiting; Osborne confirmed the correctness of the observations experimentally. During Mpemba's studies at the College of African Wildlife Management near Moshi, he published in 1969—together with Osborne—a paper on the phenomenon.

Mpemba later studied in Australia and the USA and became Principal Game Officer for the Tanzanian Ministry of Natural Resources and Tourism and a member of the African Forestry and Wildlife Commission's working party on the management of wildlife and protected areas circa 2002. He has since retired. It is believed that he died in 2020.

References 

1950 births
2020 deaths
Magamba Secondary School alumni
Tanzanian scientists